"Kate Dalrymple" is a traditional Scottish reel. The melody was originally published as "The New Highland Laddie" in 1750. It was recorded by Jimmy Shand in 1955. There are accompanying words in Scots, written by William Watt. It tells the tale of the eponymous spinster.

The National Portrait Gallery in London has a painting of the real Kate Dalrymple, a society beauty in her youth.

It is used by the BBC as the theme music for the BBC Radio Scotland dance music programme Take the Floor.

Footnotes

External links
 Lyrics

Scottish folk music
Scottish music